The Salton Sea is a 2002 American neo-noir crime thriller film directed by D. J. Caruso and starring Val Kilmer and Vincent D'Onofrio.

The film was shot on location in Los Angeles, at LA Center Studios, and the Salton Sea.

Plot

While playing the trumpet in a burning room, the protagonist's voice is heard in narration. His story begins with him posing as "Danny Parker", a speed freak addicted to methamphetamine, who hangs out with friends while indulging in drugs. He also moonlights as an informant for two corrupt cops, Gus Morgan and Al Garcetti. He is trying to set up a large meth score with notorious drug dealer Pooh Bear, an eccentric psychopath who lost his nose to excessive snorting of "gak" (meth), while also attempting to set up a sting operation for Morgan and Garcetti.

When he returns home, Parker sheds his clothes and his personality, and basks in his past life as trumpet player "Tom Van Allen". He reveals to an abused neighbor named Colette that he was once happily married, only to watch as his wife was gunned down by masked thieves during a stopover at the Salton Sea.

When meeting with Pooh Bear, Parker becomes fearful of Pooh Bear's displays of bizarre homicidal behavior, so he tapes a gun to the bottom of a table.

Parker's parents-in-law track him down, believing he has sunk into depression after his wife's death, but he tells them he does not want their help. As the deal approaches, it becomes known that Parker is not only working for the police but FBI agents working to take down Morgan and Garcetti, who have committed multiple murders. It is also revealed that they were the men who killed his wife and wounded him as they robbed a drug dealer. Parker had started his own investigation when he found out who Morgan was and delved into the drug underworld to become a believable junkie.

On the night of the deal, Parker, with the help of his best friend Jimmy, leads the FBI to the wrong location. Meanwhile, Parker arrives at Pooh Bear's house. At the dinner table, surrounded by Pooh Bear's armed friends, tensions rise and one of Pooh Bear's men tries to kill Parker, who retrieves the gun he stashed earlier and shoots the rest of the gang. Shot in the chest by Pooh Bear, Parker collapses to the floor.

Pooh Bear, wounded in the leg, goes to take a shot of meth while mumbling incoherently. Morgan and Garcetti arrive, find the massacre, and Garcetti kills Pooh Bear, whose drug-filled hypo drops to the floor. Garcetti is then killed by Parker, whose life was saved by a bulletproof vest. Morgan is shot twice by Parker, who reveals to Morgan that he knows he murdered his wife. Morgan manages to snatch Parker's gun away, but finds it empty. Parker finds Pooh Bear's syringe on the floor and plunges it into Morgan's neck, then picks up a pistol and briefly contemplates suicide, but then shoots Morgan several times and flees.

Back in his apartment, he dons his Tom Van Allen identity again, but is shot by Colette's "boyfriend", who is in fact an agent tasked with exacting vengeance for the Mexicali Boys, a leader of whom Parker turned in to the police before the events of the film's present day timeline. Collette says she was forced to betray Parker because her daughter was being held hostage. The room catches fire, and Parker plays one more tune on his trumpet before passing out.

He regains consciousness to find that Jimmy has saved him from the fire and taken him to a hospital. After he recovers, he leaves the city, and the identities of Parker and Van Allen, behind.

Cast
 Val Kilmer as Danny Parker/Tom Van Allen
 Vincent D'Onofrio as Holland Dale "Pooh-Bear" Monty
 Adam Goldberg as Kujo
 Luis Guzmán as Quincy
 Doug Hutchison as Gus Morgan
 Anthony LaPaglia as Al Garcetti
 Glenn Plummer as Bobby
 Peter Sarsgaard as Jimmy the Finn
 Deborah Kara Unger as Colette Vaughn
 Chandra West as Liz Van Allen
 B.D. Wong as Bubba
 R. Lee Ermey as Verne Plummer
 Shalom Harlow as Nancy
 Shirley Knight as Nancy Plummer
 Michael Lee Aday as Bo
 Danny Trejo as Little Bill
 Josh Todd as Big Bill

Production
In July 1999, it was announced Castle Rock Entertainment had  bought the spec comedy thriller The Salton Sea for D.J. Caruso to direct and for Frank Darabont, Eriq La Salle and Ken Aguado to produce.

Reception
Film critic Roger Ebert liked the film and the characters but gave it a mixed review:

Critic Robert Koehler, writing in Variety magazine, also gave the film a mixed review, writing, "The latest fashion, The Salton Sea strains past the breaking point to provide the old genre with new couture. Tyro helmer D.J. Caruso appears compelled to strut his cinematic stuff in every scene, whether called for or not, and in the process overplays his assignment."

The New York Times film critic Stephen Holden believes the film to be derivative, and wrote:

Slate film critic David Edelstein reviewed the work of actor Val Kilmer favorably, writing: 

, the film holds a 63% approval rating on the review aggregation website Rotten Tomatoes, based on 84 reviews with an average rating of 5.78 out of 10. The site's consensus states: "A slick Tarantino-inspired movie that is not for everyone."

References

External links
 
 
 

2002 films
2002 crime thriller films

Castle Rock Entertainment films
American crime thriller films
Films about drugs
Films directed by D. J. Caruso
Films scored by Thomas Newman
Films set in Palm Springs, California
American neo-noir films
Warner Bros. films
2002 directorial debut films
Films shot in Los Angeles
2000s English-language films
Salton Sea
2000s American films